Abryna is a genus of beetle in the family Cerambycidae.

Species include:
 Abryna affinis Breuning, 1938
 Abryna basalis Aurivillius, 1908
 Abryna buccinator Pascoe, 1864
 Abryna coenosa Newman, 1842
 Abryna copei Vives, 2009
 Abryna fausta Newman, 1842
 Abryna grisescens Breuning, 1938
 Abryna javanica Kriesche, 1924
 Abryna loochooana Matsushita, 1933
 Abryna metallica Breuning, 1938
 Abryna mindanaoensis Breuning, 1980
 Abryna obscura Schwarzer, 1925
 Abryna regispetri Paiva, 1860
 Abryna rubeta Pascoe, 1864
 Abryna ziczac Heller, 1924

References

Pteropliini